For the 1929 Isle of Man TT races the Velocette marque had high expectations of another win in the Junior TT Race.

As with 1928 TT Race meeting the 1929 Lightweight TT Race produced another first-time winner with Syd Crabtree on an Excelsior motor-cycle. The 1929 Lightweight TT Race was led for 5 laps by Pietro Ghersi on a Motor Guzzi competing in his first TT race since the disqualification in the Guzzi Incident of 1926. During the 1929 Senior TT Race a number of riders crashed at Greeba Castle after Wal Handley clipped the hedge and crashed. This included Jimmy Simpson, Jack Amott riding for Rudge and Doug Lamb who later died of his injuries on the way to Nobles Hospital.

The early leader of the 1929 Senior TT Race was H. G. Tyrell Smith riding a Rudge but crashed on 3 lap at Glen Helen. Despite cracked ribs, Tyrell Smith continued but could not match the pace of the new leader Tim Hunt riding a Norton motor-cycle.

Junior TT (350cc) 
7 laps (264.11 miles) Mountain Course.

Lightweight TT (250cc) 
7 laps (264.11 miles) Mountain Course.

Senior TT (500cc)
7 laps (264.11 miles) Mountain Course.

External links 
 Detailed race results
 Isle of Man TT winners
 Mountain Course map

Isle of Man TT
1929
Isle